Group 3 consisted of five of the 34 teams entered into the European zone: Czechoslovakia, Iceland, Soviet Union, Turkey, and Wales. These five teams competed on a home-and-away basis for two of the 14 spots in the final tournament allocated to the European zone, with the group's winner and runner-up claiming those spots.

Standings

Results

Notes

External links 
Group 3 Detailed Results at RSSSF

3
1980–81 in Czechoslovak football
1981–82 in Czechoslovak football
1980 in Icelandic football
1981 in Icelandic football
1980 in Soviet football
1981 in Soviet football
1980–81 in Turkish football
1981–82 in Turkish football
1980–81 in Welsh football
1981–82 in Welsh football